Loris Frasca (born 3 July 1995) is a French artistic gymnast. He competed at both the 2018 World Artistic Gymnastics Championships and 2019 World Artistic Gymnastics Championships. He qualified to represent France at the 2020 Summer Olympics in Tokyo, Japan.

In 2018, he won the gold medal in the men's vault event at the 2018 Mediterranean Games held in Tarragona, Spain. He also won the bronze medal in the men's artistic team all-around event. In 2019, he represented France at the 2019 European Games in Minsk, Belarus.

References

External links 
 

Living people
1995 births
People from Forbach
French male artistic gymnasts
Gymnasts at the 2019 European Games
Mediterranean Games medalists in gymnastics
Mediterranean Games gold medalists for France
Mediterranean Games bronze medalists for France
Competitors at the 2018 Mediterranean Games
Gymnasts at the 2020 Summer Olympics
Olympic gymnasts of France
Sportspeople from Moselle (department)
21st-century French people